In mathematics, the Fourier transform (FT) is a transform that converts a function into a form that describes the frequencies present in the original function.  The output of the transform is a complex-valued function of frequency. The term Fourier transform refers to both this complex-valued function and the mathematical operation.  When a distinction needs to be made the Fourier transform is sometimes called the frequency domain representation of the original function. The Fourier transform is analogous to decomposing the sound of a musical chord into terms of the intensity of its constituent pitches. 

Functions that are localized in the time domain have Fourier transforms that are spread out across the frequency domain and vice versa, a phenomenon known as the uncertainty principle. The critical case for this principle is the Gaussian function, of substantial importance in probability theory and statistics as well as in the study of physical phenomena exhibiting normal distribution  (e.g., diffusion). The Fourier transform of a Gaussian function is another Gaussian function. Joseph Fourier introduced the transform in his study of heat transfer, where Gaussian functions appear as solutions of the heat equation.

The Fourier transform can be formally defined as an improper Riemann integral, making it an integral transform, although this definition is not suitable for many applications requiring a more sophisticated integration theory. For example, many relatively simple applications use the Dirac delta function, which can be treated formally as if it were a function, but the justification requires a mathematically more sophisticated viewpoint.

The Fourier transform can also be generalized to functions of several variables on Euclidean space, sending a function of  'position space' to a function of  momentum (or a function of space and time to a function of 4-momentum). This idea makes the spatial Fourier transform very natural in the study of waves, as well as in quantum mechanics, where it is important to be able to represent wave solutions as functions of either position or momentum and sometimes both. In general, functions to which Fourier methods are applicable are complex-valued, and possibly vector-valued. The latter is routinely employed to handle periodic functions. The fast Fourier transform (FFT) is an algorithm for computing the DFT.

Definitions

The Fourier transform on R
The Fourier transform is an extension of the Fourier series, which in its most general form introduces the use of complex exponential functions.  For example, for a function , the  amplitude and phase of a frequency component at frequency , is given by this complex number:

The extension provides a frequency continuum of components  using an infinite integral of integration:

Here, the transform of function  at frequency  is denoted by the complex number , which is just one of several common conventions.  Evaluating  for all values of  produces the frequency-domain function.  When the independent variable represents time (often denoted by ), the transform variable represents frequency (often denoted by ). For example, if time is measured in seconds, then frequency is in hertz.

For each frequency, the magnitude (absolute value) of the complex value represents the amplitude of a constituent complex sinusoid with that frequency integrated over the domain, and the argument of the complex value represents that complex sinusoid's phase offset. If a frequency is not present, the transform has a value of 0 for that frequency. The Fourier transform is not limited to functions of time, but the domain of the original function is commonly referred to as the time domain. The Fourier inversion theorem provides a synthesis process that recreates the original function from its frequency domain representation.   

A function can be recovered from its Fourier series, under suitable conditions.  When this is possible, the Fourier series provides the inversion formula:

This is known as the Fourier inversion theorem, and was first introduced in Fourier's Analytical Theory of Heat, although a proof by modern standards was not given until much later.

Other notational conventions 
For other common conventions and notations, including using the angular frequency  instead of the ordinary frequency , see Other conventions and Other notations below. The Fourier transform on Euclidean space is treated separately, in which the variable  often represents position and  momentum.

Many other characterizations of the Fourier transform exist. For example, one uses the Stone–von Neumann theorem: the Fourier transform is the unique unitary intertwiner for the symplectic and Euclidean Schrödinger representations of the Heisenberg group.

Background

History

In 1821, Fourier claimed (see ) that any function, whether continuous or discontinuous, can be expanded into a series of sines. That important work was corrected and expanded upon by others to provide the foundation for the various forms of the Fourier transform used since.

Complex sinusoids
In general, the coefficients  are complex numbers, which have two equivalent forms (see Euler's formula):

The product with  has these forms:

It is noteworthy how easily the product was simplified using the polar form, and how easily the rectangular form was deduced by an application of Euler's formula.

Negative frequency 

One aspect of the Fourier transform that is often confusing is its use of negative frequency. When frequency is thought of as the rate how often something happens, or in physics, as 1/T for some period of time T.  Those notions of frequency are inherently positive.

For real-valued functions, there is a simple relationship between the values of the Fourier transform for positive and negative  (see  conjugation below). This makes it possible to avoid the subject of negative frequencies by using the sine and cosine transforms. But most authors prefer using  rather than using two transforms. One reason for this is that many applications have to take the Fourier transform of complex-valued functions, such as partial differential equations, radar, nonlinear optics, quantum mechanics, and others. In these cases, the value of the Fourier transform at negative frequencies is distinct from the value at real frequencies, and they are important. In these situations, the concept of what is a frequency is defined by the Fourier transform rather than appealing to a rate or period.

Fourier transform for periodic functions
The Fourier transform of a periodic function cannot be defined using the integral formula directly. Instead it is common to instead use Fourier series. It is possible to extend the definition to include periodic functions by viewing them as tempered distributions.

This makes it possible to see a connection between the Fourier series and the Fourier transform for periodic functions which have a convergent Fourier series.  If  periodic function, with period , that has a convergent Fourier series, then:

In other words the Fourier transform is a Dirac comb function whose teeth are multiplied by the Fourier series coefficients.

Sampling the Fourier transform 

The Fourier transform of an integrable function  can be sampled at regular intervals of  These samples can be deduced from one cycle of a periodic function  which has Fourier series coefficients proportional to those samples by the Poisson summation formula:

The integrability of  ensures the periodic summation converges.  Therefore, the samples  can be determined by:

When  has compact support,  has a finite number of terms within the interval of integration.  When  does not have compact support, numerical evaluation of  requires an approximation, such as tapering  or truncating the number of terms.

Example
The following figures provide a visual illustration of how the Fourier transform measures whether a frequency is present in a particular function. The depicted function  oscillates at 3 Hz (if  measures seconds) and tends quickly to 0. (The second factor in this equation is an envelope function that shapes the continuous sinusoid into a short pulse. Its general form is a Gaussian function). This function was specially chosen to have a real Fourier transform that can be easily plotted. The first image contains its graph. In order to calculate  we must integrate . The second image shows the plot of the real and imaginary parts of this function. The result is that when you integrate the real part of the integrand you get a relatively large number (in this case ). Therefore, in this case, the integrand oscillates fast enough so that the integral is very small and the value for the Fourier transform for that frequency is nearly zero.

The general situation may be a bit more complicated than this, but this in spirit is how the Fourier transform measures how much of an individual frequency is present in a function .

Properties of the Fourier transform

Basic properties
The Fourier transform has the following basic properties:

Linearity

Translation / time shifting

 For any real number , if , then .

Modulation / frequency shifting
 For any real number , if , then .

Time scaling
 For a non-zero real number , if , then 
 
The case  leads to the time-reversal property, which states: if , then .

Symmetry
When the real and imaginary parts of a complex function are decomposed into their even and odd parts, there are four components, denoted below by the subscripts RE, RO, IE, and IO.  And there is a one-to-one mapping between the four components of a complex time function and the four components of its complex frequency transform:

From this, various relationships are apparent, for example:
 The transform of a real-valued function is the even symmetric function .  Conversely, an even-symmetric transform implies a real-valued time-domain.
 The transform of an imaginary-valued function is the odd symmetric function , and the converse is true.
 The transform of an even-symmetric function is the real-valued function , and the converse is true.
 The transform of an odd-symmetric function is the imaginary-valued function , and the converse is true.

Conjugation
 If , then 
 
 In particular, if  is real, then one has the reality condition 
 
 that is,  is a Hermitian function. And if  is purely imaginary, then

Real and imaginary part in time
 If , then .
 If , then .

The zero frequency component
 Substituting  in the definition, we obtain
 

Invertibility and periodicity

Under suitable conditions on the function , it can be recovered from its Fourier transform . Since reversing time is two-periodic, applying this twice yields , so the Fourier transform operator is four-periodic, and similarly the inverse Fourier transform can be obtained by applying the Fourier transform three times: . In particular the Fourier transform is invertible (under suitable conditions).

More precisely, defining the parity operator  such that , we have:

These equalities of operators require careful definition of the space of functions in question, defining equality of functions (equality at every point? equality almost everywhere?) and defining equality of operators – that is, defining the topology on the function space and operator space in question. These are not true for all functions, but are true under various conditions, which are the content of the various forms of the Fourier inversion theorem.

This fourfold periodicity of the Fourier transform is similar to a rotation of the plane by 90°, particularly as the two-fold iteration yields a reversal, and in fact this analogy can be made precise. While the Fourier transform can simply be interpreted as switching the time domain and the frequency domain, with the inverse Fourier transform switching them back, more geometrically it can be interpreted as a rotation by 90° in the time–frequency domain (considering time as the -axis and frequency as the -axis), and the Fourier transform can be generalized to the fractional Fourier transform, which involves rotations by other angles. This can be further generalized to linear canonical transformations, which can be visualized as the action of the special linear group  on the time–frequency plane, with the preserved symplectic form corresponding to the uncertainty principle, below. This approach is particularly studied in signal processing, under time–frequency analysis.

Units and duality

The frequency variable must have inverse units to the units of the original function's domain (typically named  or ). For example, if  is measured in seconds,  should be in cycles per second or hertz. If the scale of time is in units of 2 seconds, then another greek letter  typically is used instead to represent angular frequency (where ) in units of radians per second. If using  for units of length, then  must be in inverse length, e.g., wavenumbers. These two distinct versions of the real line cannot be equated with each other. Therefore, the Fourier transform goes from one space of functions to a different space of functions: functions which have a different domain of definition.

In general,  must always be taken to be a linear form on the space of its domain, which is to say that the second real line is the dual space of the first real line. See the article on linear algebra for a more formal explanation and for more details. This point of view becomes essential in generalisations of the Fourier transform to general symmetry groups, including the case of Fourier series.

That there is no one preferred way (often, one says "no canonical way") to compare the two versions of the real line which are involved in the Fourier transform—fixing the units on one line does not force the scale of the units on the other line—is the reason for the plethora of rival conventions on the definition of the Fourier transform. The various definitions resulting from different choices of units differ by various constants.

Let  be the form of the Fourier transform in terms of ordinary frequency .

Because , the alternative form  (which  calls the non-unitary form in angular frequency) has no factor in its definition

This convention is common in modern physics and is the default for Wolfram Alpha, and does not mean that the frequency has become negative, since there is no canonical definition of positivity for frequency of a complex wave. It simply means that  is the amplitude of the wave    instead of the wave   (the former, with its minus sign, is often seen in the time dependence for Sinusoidal plane-wave solutions of the electromagnetic wave equation, or in the time dependence for quantum wave functions). In Electrical engineering the letter  is typically used for the imaginary unit instead of  because  is used for current.

When using dimensionless units, the constant factors might not even be written in the transform definition.

(In probability theory, and in mathematical statistics, the use of the Fourier—Stieltjes transform is preferred, because so many random variables are not of continuous type, and do not possess a density function, and one must treat not functions but distributions, i.e., measures which possess "atoms".)

From the higher point of view of group characters, which is much more abstract, all these arbitrary choices disappear, as will be explained in the later section of this article, which treats the notion of the Fourier transform of a function on a locally compact Abelian group.

Uniform continuity and the Riemann–Lebesgue lemma

The Fourier transform may be defined in some cases for non-integrable functions, but the Fourier transforms of integrable functions have several strong properties.

The Fourier transform  of any integrable function  is uniformly continuous and

By the Riemann–Lebesgue lemma,

However,  need not be integrable. For example, the Fourier transform of the rectangular function, which is integrable, is the sinc function, which is not Lebesgue integrable, because its improper integrals behave analogously to the alternating harmonic series, in converging to a sum without being absolutely convergent.

It is not generally possible to write the inverse transform as a Lebesgue integral.

holds almost everywhere. (But if  is continuous, then equality holds for every .)

Plancherel theorem and Parseval's theorem
Let  and  be integrable, and let  and  be their Fourier transforms.

 

where the bar denotes complex conjugation.

The Plancherel theorem, which follows from the above, states that

Plancherel's theorem has the interpretation in the sciences that the Fourier transform preserves the energy of the original quantity. The terminology of these formulas is not quite standardised. Parseval's theorem was proved only for Fourier series, and was first proved by Lyapunov. But Parseval's formula makes sense for the Fourier transform as well, and so even though in the context of the Fourier transform it was proved by Plancherel, it is still often referred to as Parseval's formula, or Parseval's relation, or even Parseval's theorem.

See Pontryagin duality for a general formulation of this concept in the context of locally compact abelian groups.

Poisson summation formula

The Poisson summation formula (PSF) is an equation that relates the Fourier series coefficients of the periodic summation of a function to values of the function's continuous Fourier transform. The Poisson summation formula says that for sufficiently regular functions ,

It has a variety of useful forms that are derived from the basic one by application of the Fourier transform's scaling and time-shifting properties. The formula has applications in engineering, physics, and number theory. The frequency-domain dual of the standard Poisson summation formula is also called the discrete-time Fourier transform.

Poisson summation is generally associated with the physics of periodic media, such as heat conduction on a circle. The fundamental solution of the heat equation on a circle is called a theta function. It is used in number theory to prove the transformation properties of theta functions, which turn out to be a type of modular form, and it is connected more generally to the theory of automorphic forms where it appears on one side of the Selberg trace formula.

Differentiation
Suppose  is an absolutely continuous differentiable function, and both  and its derivative  are integrable. Then the Fourier transform of the derivative is given by

More generally, the Fourier transformation of the th derivative  is given by

Analogically, 

By applying the Fourier transform and using these formulas, some ordinary differential equations can be transformed into algebraic equations, which are much easier to solve. By using the analogous rules for the inverse Fourier transform, one can also say " quickly falls to 0 for  if and only if  is smooth."

Convolution theorem

The Fourier transform translates between convolution and multiplication of functions.

This means that if:

where  denotes the convolution operation, then:

In linear time invariant (LTI) system theory, it is common to interpret  as the impulse response of an LTI system with input  and output , since substituting the unit impulse for  yields . In this case,  represents the frequency response of the system.

Cross-correlation theorem

As a special case, the autocorrelation of function  is:

for which

Eigenfunctions

The Fourier transform is a linear transform which has eigenfunctions obeying  with 

A set of eigenfunctions is found by noting that the homogeneous differential equation 
 
leads to eigenfunctions  of the Fourier transform  as long as the form of the equation remains invariant under Fourier transform. In other words, every solution  and its Fourier transform   obey the same equation. Assuming uniqueness of the solutions, every solution  must therefore be an eigenfunction of the Fourier transform. The form of the equation remains unchanged under Fourier transform if  can be expanded in a power series in which for all terms the same factor of either one of  arises from the factors  introduced by the differentiation rules upon Fourier transforming the homogeneous differential equation because this factor may then be cancelled. The simplest allowable  leads to the standard normal distribution.

More generally, a set of eigenfunctions is also found by noting that the differentiation rules imply that the ordinary differential equation 
 

with  constant and  being a non-constant even function remains invariant in form when applying the Fourier transform  to both sides of the equation. Equivalently one may use 

 

where  are the "probabilist's" Hermite polynomials, defined as

 

Under this convention for the Fourier transform, we have that

 

However, this choice of eigenfunctions is not unique. Because of  there are only four different eigenvalues of the Fourier transform (the fourth roots of unity ±1 and ±) and any linear combination of eigenfunctions with the same eigenvalue gives another eigenfunction.

Since the complete set of Hermite functions  provides a resolution of the identity they diagonalize the Fourier operator, i.e. the Fourier transform can be represented by such a sum of terms weighted by the above eigenvalues, and these sums can be explicitly summed:

This approach to define the Fourier transform was first proposed by Norbert Wiener. Among other properties, Hermite functions decrease exponentially fast in both frequency and time domains, and they are thus used to define a generalization of the Fourier transform, namely the fractional Fourier transform used in time–frequency analysis. In physics, this transform was introduced by Edward Condon. This change of basis functions becomes possible because the Fourier transform is a unitary transform when using the right conventions. Consequently, under the proper conditions it may be expected to result from a self-adjoint generator  via

The operator  is the number operator of the quantum harmonic oscillator written as

Upon extending the Fourier transform to distributions the Dirac comb is also an eigenfunction of the Fourier transform.

Connection with the Heisenberg group
These operators do not commute, as their (group) commutator is

which is multiplication by the constant (independent of )  (the circle group of unit modulus complex numbers). As an abstract group, the Heisenberg group is the three-dimensional Lie group of triples , with the group law

so that . This  can be extended to a unique automorphism of :

This operator  is the Fourier transform.

Many of the standard properties of the Fourier transform are immediate consequences of this more general framework.

Complex domain
The integral for the Fourier transform
 
can be studied for complex values of its argument .

The Paley–Wiener theorem says that  is smooth (i.e., -times differentiable for all positive integers ) and compactly supported if and only if  is a holomorphic function for which there exists a constant  such that for any integer ,
 
for some constant .

(If  is not smooth, but only , the statement still holds provided .) The space of such functions of a complex variable is called the Paley—Wiener space. This theorem has been generalised to semisimple Lie groups.

If  is supported on the half-line , then  is said to be "causal" because the impulse response function of a physically realisable filter must have this property, as no effect can precede its cause. Paley and Wiener showed that then  extends to a holomorphic function on the complex lower half-plane  which tends to zero as  goes to infinity. The converse is false and it is not known how to characterise the Fourier transform of a causal function.

Laplace transform

The Fourier transform  is related to the Laplace transform , which is also used for the solution of differential equations and the analysis of filters.

It may happen that a function  for which the Fourier integral does not converge on the real axis at all, nevertheless has a complex Fourier transform defined in some region of the complex plane.

For example, if  is of exponential growth, i.e.,
 
for some constants , then
 

The more usual version ("one-sided") of the Laplace transform is
 

If  is also causal, and analytical, then:  Thus, extending the Fourier transform to the complex domain means it includes the Laplace transform as a special case in the case of causal functions—but with the change of variable .

From another, perhaps more classical viewpoint, the Laplace transform by its form involves an additional exponential regulating term which lets it converge outside of the imaginary line where the Fourier transform is defined. As such it can converge for at most exponentially divergent series and integrals, whereas the original Fourier decomposition cannot, enabling analysis of systems with divergent or critical elements. Two particular examples from linear signal processing are the construction of allpass filter networks from critical comb and mitigating filters via exact pole-zero cancellation on the unit circle. Such designs are common in audio processing, where highly nonlinear phase response is sought for, as in reverb.

Furthermore, when extended pulselike impulse responses are sought for signal processing work, the easiest way to produce them is to have one circuit which produces a divergent time response, and then to cancel its divergence through a delayed opposite and compensatory response. There, only the delay circuit in-between admits a classical Fourier description, which is critical. Both the circuits to the side are unstable, and do not admit a convergent Fourier decomposition. However, they do admit a Laplace domain description, with identical half-planes of convergence in the complex plane (or in the discrete case, the Z-plane), wherein their effects cancel.

In modern mathematics the Laplace transform is conventionally subsumed under the aegis Fourier methods. Both of them are subsumed by the far more general, and more abstract, idea of harmonic analysis.

Inversion

 
by Cauchy's integral theorem. Therefore, the Fourier inversion formula can use integration along different lines, parallel to the real axis.

 
for any .

This theorem implies the Mellin inversion formula for the Laplace transformation,
 

 versions of these inversion formulas are also available.

Fourier transform on Euclidean space
The Fourier transform can be defined in any arbitrary number of dimensions . As with the one-dimensional case, there are many conventions. For an integrable function , this article takes the definition:

All of the basic properties listed above hold for the -dimensional Fourier transform, as do Plancherel's and Parseval's theorem. When the function is integrable, the Fourier transform is still uniformly continuous and the Riemann–Lebesgue lemma holds.

Uncertainty principle

Generally speaking, the more concentrated  is, the more spread out its Fourier transform  must be. It is not possible to arbitrarily concentrate both a function and its Fourier transform.

The trade-off between the compaction of a function and its Fourier transform can be formalized in the form of an uncertainty principle by viewing a function and its Fourier transform as conjugate variables with respect to the symplectic form on the time–frequency domain: from the point of view of the linear canonical transformation, the Fourier transform is rotation by 90° in the time–frequency domain, and preserves the symplectic form.

Suppose  is an integrable and square-integrable function. Without loss of generality, assume that  is normalized:

It follows from the Plancherel theorem that  is also normalized.

The spread around  may be measured by the dispersion about zero defined by

In probability terms, this is the second moment of  about zero.

.

The equality is attained only in the case

where  is arbitrary and  so that  is -normalized. In other words, where  is a (normalized) Gaussian function with variance , centered at zero, and its Fourier transform is a Gaussian function with variance .

In fact, this inequality implies that:

 

for any , .

In quantum mechanics, the momentum and position wave functions are Fourier transform pairs, to within a factor of Planck's constant. With this constant properly taken into account, the inequality above becomes the statement of the Heisenberg uncertainty principle.

A stronger uncertainty principle is the Hirschman uncertainty principle, which is expressed as:

where  is the differential entropy of the probability density function :

where the logarithms may be in any base that is consistent. The equality is attained for a Gaussian, as in the previous case.

Sine and cosine transforms

Fourier's original formulation of the transform did not use complex numbers, but rather sines and cosines. Statisticians and others still use this form. An absolutely integrable function  for which Fourier inversion holds can be expanded in terms of genuine frequencies (avoiding negative frequencies, which are sometimes considered hard to interpret physically)  by

This is called an expansion as a trigonometric integral, or a Fourier integral expansion. The coefficient functions  and  can be found by using variants of the Fourier cosine transform and the Fourier sine transform (the normalisations are, again, not standardised):

and

Older literature refers to the two transform functions, the Fourier cosine transform, and the Fourier sine transform, .

The function  can be recovered from the sine and cosine transform using

together with trigonometric identities. This is referred to as Fourier's integral formula.

Spherical harmonics
The set  consists of the solid spherical harmonics of degree . The solid spherical harmonics play a similar role in higher dimensions to the Hermite polynomials in dimension one. The space  is then a direct sum of the spaces  and the Fourier transform maps each space  to itself and is possible to characterize the action of the Fourier transform on each space .

where

Here  denotes the Bessel function of the first kind with order . When  this gives a useful formula for the Fourier transform of a radial function. This is essentially the Hankel transform. Moreover, there is a simple recursion relating the cases  and  allowing to compute, e.g., the three-dimensional Fourier transform of a radial function from the one-dimensional one.

Restriction problems
In higher dimensions it becomes interesting to study restriction problems for the Fourier transform. The Fourier transform of an integrable function is continuous and the restriction of this function to any set is defined. But for a square-integrable function the Fourier transform could be a general class of square integrable functions. As such, the restriction of the Fourier transform of an  function cannot be defined on sets of measure 0. Surprisingly, it is possible in some cases to define the restriction of a Fourier transform to a set , provided  has non-zero curvature.

One notable difference between the Fourier transform in 1 dimension versus higher dimensions concerns the partial sum operator. Consider an increasing collection of measurable sets  indexed by : such as balls of radius  centered at the origin, or cubes of side . For a given integrable function , consider the function  defined by:

Suppose in addition that . In the case that  is taken to be a cube with side length , then convergence still holds. Another natural candidate is the Euclidean ball . For  it is a celebrated theorem of Charles Fefferman that the multiplier for the unit ball is never bounded unless .

Fourier transform on function spaces

On  spaces

On 
The definition of the Fourier transform by the integral formula

is valid for Lebesgue integrable functions ; that is, .

The Fourier transform  is a bounded operator. This follows from the observation that

which shows that its operator norm is bounded by 1. Indeed, it equals 1, which can be seen, for example, from the transform of the rect function. Indeed, there is no simple characterization of the image.

On 

where the limit is taken in the  sense.

Furthermore,  is a unitary operator. For an operator to be unitary it is sufficient to show that it is bijective and preserves the inner product, so in this case these follow from the Fourier inversion theorem combined with the fact that for any  we have

 

On other 
Further extensions become more technical.

Tempered distributions

In fact the Fourier transform of an element in  can not vanish on an open set; see the above discussion on the uncertainty principle. The right space here is the slightly larger space of Schwartz functions. The Fourier transform is an automorphism on the Schwartz space, as a topological vector space, and thus induces an automorphism on its dual, the space of tempered distributions. The tempered distributions include all the integrable functions mentioned above, as well as well-behaved functions of polynomial growth and distributions of compact support.

For the definition of the Fourier transform of a tempered distribution, let  and  be integrable functions, and let  and  be their Fourier transforms respectively. Then the Fourier transform obeys the following multiplication formula,

Every integrable function  defines (induces) a distribution  by the relation

for all Schwartz functions .

for all Schwartz functions . Extending this to all tempered distributions  gives the general definition of the Fourier transform.

Distributions can be differentiated and the above-mentioned compatibility of the Fourier transform with differentiation and convolution remains true for tempered distributions.

Generalizations

Fourier–Stieltjes transform

This transform continues to enjoy many of the properties of the Fourier transform of integrable functions. One notable difference is that the Riemann–Lebesgue lemma fails for measures. In the case when the distribution has a probability density function this definition reduces to the Fourier transform applied to the probability density function, again with a different choice of constants.

The Fourier transform may be used to give a characterization of measures. Bochner's theorem characterizes which functions may arise as the Fourier–Stieltjes transform of a positive measure on the circle.

Furthermore, the Dirac delta function, although not a function, is a finite Borel measure. Its Fourier transform is a constant function (whose specific value depends upon the form of the Fourier transform used).

Locally compact abelian groups

The Fourier transform may be generalized to any locally compact abelian group. A locally compact abelian group is an abelian group that is at the same time a locally compact Hausdorff topological space so that the group operation is continuous. If  is a locally compact abelian group, it has a translation invariant measure , called Haar measure. For a locally compact abelian group , the set of irreducible, i.e. one-dimensional, unitary representations are called its characters.

Now the group  is no longer finite but still compact, and it preserves the orthonormality of character table. The sequence  is an orthonormal basis of the space of class functions .

For any representation  of a finite group ,  can be expressed as the span  ( are the irreps of ), such that .

Gelfand transform

The Fourier transform is also a special case of Gelfand transform. In this particular context, it is closely related to the Pontryagin duality map defined above.

Given an abelian locally compact Hausdorff topological group , as before we consider space , defined using a Haar measure. With convolution as multiplication,  is an abelian Banach algebra. It also has an involution * given by

The map is simply given by

Compact non-abelian groups
The Fourier transform can also be defined for functions on a non-abelian group, provided that the group is compact. Removing the assumption that the underlying group is abelian, irreducible unitary representations need not always be one-dimensional. This means the Fourier transform on a non-abelian group takes values as Hilbert space operators. The Fourier transform on compact groups is a major tool in representation theory and non-commutative harmonic analysis.

Let  be a compact Hausdorff topological group. Let  denote the collection of all isomorphism classes of finite-dimensional irreducible unitary representations, along with a definite choice of representation  on the Hilbert space  of finite dimension  for each .

The mapping

is finite.

and  has a natural -algebra structure as Hilbert space operators.

The Peter–Weyl theorem holds, and a version of the Fourier inversion formula (Plancherel's theorem) follows: if , then

where the summation is understood as convergent in the  sense.

The generalization of the Fourier transform to the noncommutative situation has also in part contributed to the development of noncommutative geometry. In this context, a categorical generalization of the Fourier transform to noncommutative groups is Tannaka–Krein duality, which replaces the group of characters with the category of representations. However, this loses the connection with harmonic functions.

Alternatives
In signal processing terms, a function (of time) is a representation of a signal with perfect time resolution, but no frequency information, while the Fourier transform has perfect frequency resolution, but no time information: the magnitude of the Fourier transform at a point is how much frequency content there is, but location is only given by phase (argument of the Fourier transform at a point), and standing waves are not localized in time – a sine wave continues out to infinity, without decaying. This limits the usefulness of the Fourier transform for analyzing signals that are localized in time, notably transients, or any signal of finite extent.

As alternatives to the Fourier transform, in time–frequency analysis, one uses time–frequency transforms or time–frequency distributions to represent signals in a form that has some time information and some frequency information – by the uncertainty principle, there is a trade-off between these. These can be generalizations of the Fourier transform, such as the short-time Fourier transform or fractional Fourier transform, or other functions to represent signals, as in wavelet transforms and chirplet transforms, with the wavelet analog of the (continuous) Fourier transform being the continuous wavelet transform.

Applications

Linear operations performed in one domain (time or frequency) have corresponding operations in the other domain, which are sometimes easier to perform. The operation of differentiation in the time domain corresponds to multiplication by the frequency, so some differential equations are easier to analyze in the frequency domain. Also, convolution in the time domain corresponds to ordinary multiplication in the frequency domain (see Convolution theorem). After performing the desired operations, transformation of the result can be made back to the time domain. Harmonic analysis is the systematic study of the relationship between the frequency and time domains, including the kinds of functions or operations that are "simpler" in one or the other, and has deep connections to many areas of modern mathematics.

Analysis of differential equations
Perhaps the most important use of the Fourier transformation is to solve partial differential equations.
Many of the equations of the mathematical physics of the nineteenth century can be treated this way. Fourier studied the heat equation, which in one dimension and in dimensionless units is

The example we will give, a slightly more difficult one, is the wave equation in one dimension,

As usual, the problem is not to find a solution: there are infinitely many. The problem is that of the so-called "boundary problem": find a solution which satisfies the "boundary conditions"

For the heat equation, only one boundary condition can be required (usually the first one). But for the wave equation, there are still infinitely many solutions  which satisfy the first boundary condition. But when one imposes both conditions, there is only one possible solution.

It is easier to find the Fourier transform  of the solution than to find the solution directly. This is because the Fourier transformation takes differentiation into multiplication by the Fourier-dual variable, and so a partial differential equation applied to the original function is transformed into multiplication by polynomial functions of the dual variables applied to the transformed function. After  is determined, we can apply the inverse Fourier transformation to find .

Fourier's method is as follows. First, note that any function of the forms

satisfies the wave equation. These are called the elementary solutions.

Second, note that therefore any integral

satisfies the wave equation for arbitrary . This integral may be interpreted as a continuous linear combination of solutions for the linear equation.

Now this resembles the formula for the Fourier synthesis of a function.

The third step is to examine how to find the specific unknown coefficient functions  and  that will lead to  satisfying the boundary conditions. So we will set . Assuming that the conditions needed for Fourier inversion are satisfied, we can then find the Fourier sine and cosine transforms (in the variable ) of both sides and obtain

and

and

But this integral was in the form of a Fourier integral. But these expressions also took the form of a Fourier integral because of the properties of the Fourier transform of a derivative.

From a higher point of view, Fourier's procedure can be reformulated more conceptually. Since there are two variables, we will use the Fourier transformation in both  and  rather than operate as Fourier did, who only transformed in the spatial variables. Note that  must be considered in the sense of a distribution since  is not going to be : as a wave, it will persist through time and thus is not a transient phenomenon. But it will be bounded and so its Fourier transform can be defined as a distribution. Then the wave equation becomes an algebraic equation in :

This is equivalent to requiring  unless . Right away, this explains why the choice of elementary solutions we made earlier worked so well: obviously  will be solutions. Applying Fourier inversion to these delta functions, we obtain the elementary solutions we picked earlier. But from the higher point of view, one does not pick elementary solutions, but rather considers the space of all distributions which are supported on the (degenerate) conic .

We may as well consider the distributions supported on the conic that are given by distributions of one variable on the line  plus distributions on the line  as follows: if  is any test function,

Then Fourier inversion gives, for the boundary conditions, something very similar to what we had more concretely above (put , which is clearly of polynomial growth):

and

From a calculational point of view, the drawback of course is that one must first calculate the Fourier transforms of the boundary conditions, then assemble the solution from these, and then calculate an inverse Fourier transform. Closed form formulas are rare, except when there is some geometric symmetry that can be exploited, and the numerical calculations are difficult because of the oscillatory nature of the integrals, which makes convergence slow and hard to estimate. For practical calculations, other methods are often used.

The twentieth century has seen the extension of these methods to all linear partial differential equations with polynomial coefficients, and by extending the notion of Fourier transformation to include Fourier integral operators, some non-linear equations as well.

Fourier-transform spectroscopy

The Fourier transform is also used in nuclear magnetic resonance (NMR) and in other kinds of spectroscopy, e.g. infrared (FTIR). In NMR an exponentially shaped free induction decay (FID) signal is acquired in the time domain and Fourier-transformed to a Lorentzian line-shape in the frequency domain. The Fourier transform is also used in magnetic resonance imaging (MRI) and mass spectrometry.

Quantum mechanics
The Fourier transform is useful in quantum mechanics in at least two different ways. To begin with, the basic conceptual structure of quantum mechanics postulates the existence of pairs of complementary variables, connected by the Heisenberg uncertainty principle. For example, in one dimension, the spatial variable  of, say, a particle, can only be measured by the quantum mechanical "position operator" at the cost of losing information about the momentum  of the particle. In classical mechanics, the physical state of a particle (existing in one dimension, for simplicity of exposition) would be given by assigning definite values to both  and  simultaneously. Thus, the set of all possible physical states is the two-dimensional real vector space with a -axis and a -axis called the phase space.

In contrast, quantum mechanics chooses a polarisation of this space in the sense that it picks a subspace of one-half the dimension, for example, the -axis alone, but instead of considering only points, takes the set of all complex-valued "wave functions" on this axis. Nevertheless, choosing the -axis is an equally valid polarisation, yielding a different representation of the set of possible physical states of the particle which is related to the first representation by the Fourier transformation

Therefore, the Fourier transform can be used to pass from one way of representing the state of the particle, by a wave function of position, to another way of representing the state of the particle: by a wave function of momentum. Infinitely many different polarisations are possible, and all are equally valid. Being able to transform states from one representation to another by the Fourier transform is not only convenient but also the underlying reason of the Heisenberg uncertainty principle.

The other use of the Fourier transform in both quantum mechanics and quantum field theory is to solve the applicable wave equation. In non-relativistic quantum mechanics, Schrödinger's equation for a time-varying wave function in one-dimension, not subject to external forces, is

This is the same as the heat equation except for the presence of the imaginary unit . Fourier methods can be used to solve this equation.

In the presence of a potential, given by the potential energy function , the equation becomes

Neither of these approaches is of much practical use in quantum mechanics. Boundary value problems and the time-evolution of the wave function is not of much practical interest: it is the stationary states that are most important.

In relativistic quantum mechanics, Schrödinger's equation becomes a wave equation as was usual in classical physics, except that complex-valued waves are considered. A simple example, in the absence of interactions with other particles or fields, is the free one-dimensional Klein–Gordon–Schrödinger–Fock equation, this time in dimensionless units,

This is, from the mathematical point of view, the same as the wave equation of classical physics solved above (but with a complex-valued wave, which makes no difference in the methods). This is of great use in quantum field theory: each separate Fourier component of a wave can be treated as a separate harmonic oscillator and then quantized, a procedure known as "second quantization". Fourier methods have been adapted to also deal with non-trivial interactions.

Finally, the number operator of the quantum harmonic oscillator can be interpreted, for example via the  Mehler kernel, as the generator of the Fourier transform .

Signal processing
The Fourier transform is used for the spectral analysis of time-series. The subject of statistical signal processing does not, however, usually apply the Fourier transformation to the signal itself. Even if a real signal is indeed transient, it has been found in practice advisable to model a signal by a function (or, alternatively, a stochastic process) which is stationary in the sense that its characteristic properties are constant over all time. The Fourier transform of such a function does not exist in the usual sense, and it has been found more useful for the analysis of signals to instead take the Fourier transform of its autocorrelation function.

The autocorrelation function  of a function  is defined by

The autocorrelation function, more properly called the autocovariance function unless it is normalized in some appropriate fashion, measures the strength of the correlation between the values of  separated by a time lag. It is useful even for other statistical tasks besides the analysis of signals. For example, if  represents the temperature at time , one expects a strong correlation with the temperature at a time lag of 24 hours.

It possesses a Fourier transform,

The power spectrum, as indicated by this density function , measures the amount of variance contributed to the data by the frequency . In electrical signals, the variance is proportional to the average power (energy per unit time), and so the power spectrum describes how much the different frequencies contribute to the average power of the signal. This process is called the spectral analysis of time-series and is analogous to the usual analysis of variance of data that is not a time-series (ANOVA).

Knowledge of which frequencies are "important" in this sense is crucial for the proper design of filters and for the proper evaluation of measuring apparatuses. It can also be useful for the scientific analysis of the phenomena responsible for producing the data.

The power spectrum of a signal can also be approximately measured directly by measuring the average power that remains in a signal after all the frequencies outside a narrow band have been filtered out.

Spectral analysis is carried out for visual signals as well. The power spectrum ignores all phase relations, which is good enough for many purposes, but for video signals other types of spectral analysis must also be employed, still using the Fourier transform as a tool.

Other notations
Other common notations for  include:

In some contexts such as particle physics, the same symbol  may be used for both for a function as well as it Fourier transform, with the two only distinguished by their argument:  would refer to the Fourier transform because of the momentum argument, while  would refer to the original function because of the positional argument.

The interpretation of the complex function  may be aided by expressing it in polar coordinate form

in terms of the two real functions  and  where:

is the amplitude and

is the phase (see arg function).

Then the inverse transform can be written:

The Fourier transform may be thought of as a mapping on function spaces.

In mathematics and various applied sciences, it is often necessary to distinguish between a function  and the value of  when its variable equals , denoted . Despite this flaw, the previous notation appears frequently, often when a particular function or a function of a particular variable is to be transformed. For example,

is sometimes used to express that the Fourier transform of a rectangular function is a sinc function, or

is used to express the shift property of the Fourier transform.

Other conventions
The Fourier transform can also be written in terms of angular frequency:

whose units are radians per second.

The substitution  into the formulas above produces this convention:

Under this convention, the inverse transform becomes:

There is also less symmetry between the formulas for the Fourier transform and its inverse.

Another convention is to split the factor of  evenly between the Fourier transform and its inverse, which leads to definitions:

It also restores the symmetry between the Fourier transform and its inverse.

Variations of all three conventions can be created by conjugating the complex-exponential kernel of both the forward and the reverse transform. The signs must be opposites. Other than that, the choice is (again) a matter of convention.

As discussed above, the characteristic function of a random variable is the same as the Fourier–Stieltjes transform of its distribution measure, but in this context it is typical to take a different convention for the constants. Typically characteristic function is defined

As in the case of the "non-unitary angular frequency" convention above, the factor of 2 appears in neither the normalizing constant nor the exponent. Unlike any of the conventions appearing above, this convention takes the opposite sign in the exponent.

Computation methods
The appropriate computation method largely depends how the original mathematical function is represented and the desired form of the output function.

Since the fundamental definition of a Fourier transform is an integral, functions that can be expressed as closed-form expressions are commonly computed by working the integral analytically to yield a closed-form expression in the Fourier transform conjugate variable as the result. This is the method used to generate tables of Fourier transforms, including those found in the table below (Fourier transform#Tables of important Fourier transforms).

Many computer algebra systems such as Matlab and Mathematica that are capable of symbolic integration are capable of computing Fourier transforms analytically. For example, to compute the Fourier transform of  one might enter the command  into Wolfram Alpha.

Numerical integration of closed-form functions
If the input function is in closed-form and the desired output function is a series of ordered pairs (for example a table of values from which a graph can be generated) over a specified domain, then the Fourier transform can be generated by numerical integration at each value of the Fourier conjugate variable (frequency, for example) for which a value of the output variable is desired. Note that this method requires computing a separate numerical integration for each value of frequency for which a value of the Fourier transform is desired. The numerical integration approach works on a much broader class of functions than the analytic approach, because it yields results for functions that do not have closed form Fourier transform integrals.

Numerical integration of a series of ordered pairs
If the input function is a series of ordered pairs (for example, a time series from measuring an output variable repeatedly over a time interval) then the output function must also be a series of ordered pairs (for example, a complex number vs. frequency over a specified domain of frequencies), unless certain assumptions and approximations are made allowing the output function to be approximated by a closed-form expression. In the general case where the available input series of ordered pairs are assumed be samples representing a continuous function over an interval (amplitude vs. time, for example), the series of ordered pairs representing the desired output function can be obtained by numerical integration of the input data over the available interval at each value of the Fourier conjugate variable (frequency, for example) for which the value of the Fourier transform is desired.

Explicit numerical integration over the ordered pairs can yield the Fourier transform output value for any desired value of the conjugate Fourier transform variable (frequency, for example), so that a spectrum can be produced at any desired step size and over any desired variable range for accurate determination of amplitudes, frequencies, and phases corresponding to isolated peaks. Unlike limitations in DFT and FFT methods, explicit numerical integration can have any desired step size and compute the Fourier transform over any desired range of the conjugate Fourier transform variable (for example, frequency).

Discrete Fourier transforms and fast Fourier transforms
If the ordered pairs representing the original input function are equally spaced in their input variable (for example, equal time steps), then the Fourier transform is known as a discrete Fourier transform (DFT), which can be computed either by explicit numerical integration, by explicit evaluation of the DFT definition, or by fast Fourier transform (FFT) methods. In contrast to explicit integration of input data, use of the DFT and FFT methods produces Fourier transforms described by ordered pairs of step size equal to the reciprocal of the original sampling interval. For example, if the input data is sampled every 10 seconds, the output of DFT and FFT methods will have a 0.1 Hz frequency spacing.

Tables of important Fourier transforms
The following tables record some closed-form Fourier transforms. Only the three most common conventions are included. It may be useful to notice that entry 105 gives a relationship between the Fourier transform of a function and the original function, which can be seen as relating the Fourier transform and its inverse.

Functional relationships, one-dimensional

Square-integrable functions, one-dimensional

Distributions, one-dimensional

Two-dimensional functions

Formulas for general -dimensional functions

See also

Analog signal processing
Beevers–Lipson strip
Constant-Q transform
Discrete Fourier transform
DFT matrix
Fast Fourier transform
Fourier integral operator
Fourier inversion theorem
Fourier multiplier
Fourier series
Fourier sine transform
Fourier–Deligne transform
Fourier–Mukai transform
Fractional Fourier transform
Indirect Fourier transform 
Integral transform
Hankel transform
Hartley transform
Laplace transform
Least-squares spectral analysis
Linear canonical transform
Mellin transform
Multidimensional transform
NGC 4622, especially the image NGC 4622 Fourier transform .
Nonlocal operator
Quantum Fourier transform
Short-time Fourier transform
Spectral density
Spectral density estimation
Symbolic integration
Time stretch dispersive Fourier transform
Transform (mathematics)

Notes

Citations

References

.

.

.

.

.

.

.

.

.

.

.

.

.

.

.

.

.

 (translated from French).

.

.

.

.

 (translated from Russian).

 (translated from Russian).

.

.

.

.

.

.

.

.

 (translated from Russian).

.

 (translated from Russian).

.

; also available at Fundamentals of Music Processing, Section 2.1, pages 40-56.

.

.

.

.

.

.

.

.

.

.

.

.

.

.

.

.

.

.

.

.

.

External links

Encyclopedia of Mathematics

Fourier analysis
Integral transforms
Unitary operators
Joseph Fourier
Mathematical physics